Prince Maximilian of Saxony (Maximilian Maria Joseph Anton Johann Baptist Johann Evangelista Ignaz Augustin Xavier Aloys Johann Nepomuk Januar Hermenegild Agnellis Paschalis; 13 April 1759 – 3 January 1838) was a German prince and a member of the House of Wettin. He was the sixth child, however third child to survive childhood, and youngest surviving son of Frederick Christian, Elector of Saxony, and the German composer Duchess Maria Antonia Walpurgis of Bavaria.

Life
Since he was the youngest son of the family, Maximilian initially had little chance to inherit the Electorate of Saxony. However, by 1800, Maximilian was the third in line to the Electorate due to the children of his two eldest brothers, Frederick Augustus and Anthony, died in infancy, except Maria Augusta, Frederick Augustus's only surviving offspring. After the creation of the Kingdom of Saxony in 1806, Maximilian became a Prince of Saxony.

After the death of Frederick Augustus in 1827, Anthony succeeded him as King. Maximilian became first in line to the Saxon throne as Hereditary Prince. However, three years later, on 1 September 1830, during the Autumn Disturbances, he renounced his rights of succession in favour of his eldest son, Frederick Augustus. He died eight years later, aged seventy-eight.

Marriages and issue
In Parma on 22 April 1792, Maximilian and Princess Maria Carolina of Bourbon-Parma wed, Maria Carolina being the eldest child of Ferdinand, Duke of Parma and Maria Amalia, Duchess of Parma of Austria, by proxy, and in person in Dresden on 9 May 1792.

Maxilimian and Carolina bore eight children:

 Maria Amalia (10 August 1794 - 18 September 1870)
 Maria Ferdinanda (27 April 1796 - 3 January 1865); married on 6 May 1821 to Ferdinand III, Grand Duke of Tuscany.
 Frederick Augustus II (18 May 1797 - 9 August 1854); King of Saxony, 1836. Married on 7 Oct 1819 to Archduchess Marie Caroline of Austria. Married secondly on 24 April 1833 to Princess Maria Anna of Bavaria
 Clemens Maria Joseph (1 May 1798 - 4 January 1822)
 Maria Anna (15 November 1799 - 24 March 1832); married on 16 November 1817 to Leopold II, Grand Duke of Tuscany.
 Johann I (12 December 1801 - 29 October 1873); King of Saxony, 1854. Married on 10 November 1822 to Princess Amalie of Bavaria.
 Maria Josepha Amalia (6 December 1803 - 17 May 1829); married on 20 October 1819 to King Ferdinand VII of Spain.

In Lucca on 15 October 1825 Maximilian married Maria Luisa Carlotta of Parma, daughter of King Louis of Etruria and niece of his first wife Carolina, by proxy, and the two wed in person in Dresden on 7 November 1825. She was forty-three years younger than her husband; they had no children.

Honours
 : Knight of the Order of the White Eagle, 1762
 :
 Knight of the Order of the Golden Fleece, 16 March 1792
 Grand Cross of the Order of Charles III, 10 December 1824
  French Empire: Grand Eagle of the Legion of Honour, 1807/08
 :
 Knight of the Order of the Rue Crown, 1807
 Grand Cross of the Civil Merit Order, 1815
 : Knight of the Order of St. Hubert, 1808
  Kingdom of Portugal: Grand Cross of the Sash of the Two Orders (Christ and St. James), 1825
 : Grand Cross of the Order of St. Ferdinand and Merit
  Grand Duchy of Tuscany: Grand Cross of the Order of St. Joseph

Ancestry

References 

1759 births
1838 deaths
House of Wettin
Saxon princes
Knights of the Golden Fleece of Spain
2
2
Burials at Dresden Cathedral
Nobility from Dresden
German Roman Catholics
Albertine branch
Grand Croix of the Légion d'honneur
Recipients of the Order of the White Eagle (Poland)
Sons of monarchs
Non-inheriting heirs presumptive